The  2019 Women’s European Boxing Championships was hosted and organized by the Spanish Boxing Federation in Pabellón Amaya Valdemoro, Alcobendas, Spain in 2019. The event was held from 24 to 31 August 2019. The tournament was organized in association with the European Boxing Confederation (EUBC).

Medal table

Medal winners

Participating nations 
136 boxers from 31 nations competed.

 (3)
 (9)
 (6)
 (3)
 (4)
 (2)
 (6)
 (1)
 (8)
 (1)
 (9)
 (4)
 (8)
 (1)
 (2)
 (1)
 (1)
 (2)
 (2)
 (8)
 (7)
 (10)
 (1)
 (5)
 (2)
 (6)
 (2)
 (3)
 (8)
 (10)
 (1)

References

Women's European Amateur Boxing Championships
Boxing
Boxing competitions in Spain
European Amateur Boxing Championships
2019 in the Community of Madrid
2019 in Spanish women's sport
Boxing
European
Sport in Alcobendas